Herman Carel Felix Clotilde von Heijden (11 April 1890 in Weerselo – 17 November 1982 in Boxtel) was a football (soccer) player from the Netherlands, who represented his home country at the 1920 Summer Olympics. There he won the bronze medal with the Netherlands national football team. He was also present at the 1912 Summer Olympics although he did not play and therefore received no medal. Later he became mayor of Rosmalen, North Brabant (1923–1955).

References

External links
  Dutch Olympic Committee

1890 births
1982 deaths
Dutch footballers
Footballers at the 1920 Summer Olympics
Mayors in North Brabant
Netherlands international footballers
Olympic bronze medalists for the Netherlands
Olympic footballers of the Netherlands
Olympic medalists in football
People from Rosmalen
People from Weerselo
Medalists at the 1920 Summer Olympics
Association football forwards
Quick 1888 players
Footballers from Overijssel
Footballers from North Brabant